Jacob Pinkerfeld, also spelled Pinkerfield (1897–1956) was an Israeli archaeologist and architect.

Biography
Jacob Pinkerfeld was born in the city of Przemysl, Galicia, Poland in 1897, the son of an architect. He joined the Hashomer Hatzair youth movement and later studied architecture at the College of Technology in Vienna, Austria. Pinkerfeld moved to the Land of Israel with Hashomer Hatzair in 1920 and lived in Zichron Ya'acov. He returned to Europe to recover from malaria and pneumonia, after which he graduated university as an engineer-architect in 1925. That year, Pinkerfeld moved back to the Land of Israel.

Architecture and Jewish art research
Pinkerfeld worked as an architect and designer, building a large number of public structures. According to the Artlog website, "his dream was to establish a Research Institute for Jewish Art. Together with a group of friends he founded "Ganza", the Society for Jewish Craft, which later became the Museum of Ethnography and Folklore in Tel Aviv, and acted as its Director from 1950 until his untimely death.

Archaeology career
He worked on excavations at :de:Tell el-Kheleifeh, which Nelson Glueck at the time had mistakenly identified as Solomon's Ezion-geber, and at the putative site of the Church of Zion on Mount Zion in Jerusalem, his findings forming the basis of Bargil Pixner's thesis of a pre-Crusader Jewish-Christian church on the site. Pinkerfeld was one of the four archaeologists killed in the Ramat Rachel shooting attack on September 23, 1956.

Published works
 The Synagogues of Eretz YIsrael. (Hebrew) Rabbi Kook Institute (1945/1946)
 The Synagogues of Italy. (Hebrew) Bialik Institute; (1954)
 Bishvili Omanut Yehudit: Sefer Zichron (Hebrew) (1957)
 The Synagogues of North Africa. (Hebrew) Bialik Institute (1974)
 Jerusalem: Synagogues and the Karaite Community.

References

External links
Jacob Pinkerfeld - 1897-1956, a concise, but detailed biography at Bauhaus.co.il (accessed April 2020)
Jacob Pinkerfeld page on Hebrew Wikipedia
 List of works by Jacob Pinkerfeld in the National Library of Israel catalog

1897 births
1956 deaths
Israeli archaeologists
20th-century archaeologists
Polish emigrants to Mandatory Palestine
Hashomer Hatzair members
Mass murder victims
Deaths by firearm in Israel